The 2022–23 Loyola Ramblers men's basketball team represented Loyola University Chicago during the 2022–23 NCAA Division I men's basketball season. The Ramblers, led by second-year head coach Drew Valentine, played their home games at the Joseph J. Gentile Arena in Chicago, Illinois as first-year members of the Atlantic 10 Conference.

Previous season
The Ramblers finished 2021–22 season 25–7, 13–5 in Missouri Valley Conference play to finish in a three-way tie for second place. As the No. 4 seed in the MVC tournament, they defeated Bradley, Northern Iowa, and Drake to win the MVC tournament for the second consecutive season. As a result, they received the conference's automatic bid to the NCAA tournament as the No. 10 seed, where they lost in the first round to Ohio State.

On November 16, 2021, Loyola announced that the season would be the last season for the team in the Missouri Valley Conference as they would join the Atlantic 10 in July 2022.

Offseason

Departures

Incoming transfers

2022 recruiting class

Roster

Schedule and results

|-
!colspan=9 style=| Exhibition

|-
!colspan=9 style=| Regular season

|-
!colspan=12 style=| Atlantic 10 regular season

|-
!colspan=12 style=| A-10 tournament

Source:

References

Loyola
Loyola Ramblers men's basketball seasons
Loyola Ramblers men
Loyola Ramblers men
2020 in Illinois
2020s in Chicago